Wilson Peter Kinyonga (1947? – August, 1995) was an influential musician in Kenya. Born in Tanzania, Wilson Kinyonga and his brother George Kinyonga founded the rumba band Simba Wanyika which would later spawn Les Wanyika, Super Wanyika Stars and other offshoots. Les Wanyika was to become more popular as Simba Wanyika disintegrated. The death of George Peter Kinyonga in August 1995 served as the last nail in the coffin for Simba Wanyika. Subsequent attempts by some former band members to reassemble the band have not been successful.

Wilson and George Kinyonga began as musicians in their home town of Tanga in Tanzania when they joined Jamhuri Jazz Band in 1966. They moved to Arusha in 1970 and formed Arusha Jazz Band with their other brother, William Kinyonga. In 1970 they moved to Kenya and formed Simba Wanyika, which would become one of the most influential bands in the history of East African music.

External links
Simba Wanyika (BBC)
Simba Wanyika: Afropop Band

1947 births
1995 deaths
Kenyan musicians
Tanzanian musicians
Tanzanian emigrants to Kenya